The following is a List of Geo vehicles

Model history

See also

List of automobiles

References

Geo
Geo (automobile)